Esperite is a rare complex calcium lead zinc silicate (PbCa3Zn4(SiO4)4) related to beryllonite and trimerite that used to be called calcium larsenite. 

Esperite has a white, greasy appearance in daylight and is much prized for its brilliant yellow green fluorescence under shortwave ultraviolet light. It is found in association with calcite, franklinite, willemite, hardystonite and clinohedrite. It has also been found as prismatic crystals up to 1 mm in length at the El Dragon Mine, Potosi, Bolivia in association with allophane, chalcomenite, clinochalcomenite and barite.

References

Mineral galleries
Pete Dunn, Franklin and Sterling Hill, New Jersey: the world's most magnificent mineral deposits, part 3 p. 368 (1995)
G. Grundmann, et al.: The El Dragon Mine, Potosi Bolivia, Mineralogical Record v.21 #2 p. 142 (1990)
Anthony et al., Handbook of Mineralogy, Vol. 2 (silicates) part 1 p. 225 (1995)
Robbins, Manuel: Fluorescence Gems and Minerals under Ultraviolet Light Geoscience Press pp 50–51,243 (1994)

Calcium minerals
Lead minerals
Zinc minerals
Nesosilicates
Monoclinic minerals
Minerals in space group 11
Minerals described in 1928